Bill Higginson may refer to:

 William J. Higginson (1938–2008), American poet, translator and author
 Bill Higginson (cricketer) (born 1936), English cricketer